Parafreutreta conferta is a species of tephritid or fruit flies in the genus Parafreutreta of the family Tephritidae.

Distribution
South Africa.

References

Tephritinae
Insects described in 1926
Taxa named by Mario Bezzi
Diptera of Africa